The Wuhan World Trade Tower is a 273-meter (896 foot) tall skyscraper located in Wuhan, Hubei, China. It became the tallest building in Wuhan after its completion. However, it was surpassed by the Minsheng Bank Building in 2007. As of September 2015 it is the 4th tallest in Wuhan measured up to the highest architectural point.

It was completed in 1998 and has 60 floors, two of which are underground and 58 are above ground. The lower levels of serve as a shopping mall and all levels above the mall serve as office spaces.

The tower's total height is 273 meters with the antenna. The tower is 248 metres tall up to the spire and 229 meters tall up to the roof. It has a total floor area of 1,430,000 square meters. The postmodern skyscraper is a tube-in-tube style structure with a curtain wall facade.

See also
List of skyscrapers
List of tallest buildings in Wuhan
List of tallest buildings in China

References

External links
 SkyscraperPage.com's entry
 Emporis.com - Building ID 104189

Skyscraper office buildings in Wuhan
Office buildings completed in 1998
Shopping malls in Wuhan
Skyscrapers in Wuhan